The Fairchild AU-23 Peacemaker is an American armed gunship, counter-insurgency, utility transport version of the Pilatus PC-6 Porter for the United States Air Force. A total of 35 were built under license in the United States by Fairchild Industries, for use during the Vietnam War in the early 1970s. All aircraft were later sold to the Royal Thai Air Force.

Design and development

In May 1971 the Aeronautical Systems Division at Wright-Patterson Air Force Base, Ohio, began work on a project to evaluate the potential use of armed light utility short takeoff and landing aircraft in Southeast Asia. The program, named Credible Chase, was designed to add mobility and firepower to the South Vietnamese Republic of Vietnam Air Force (RVNAF) in a relatively short time. Two commercial aircraft were selected for testing: the Fairchild Porter and the Helio Stallion. Initial performance testing was conducted with leased aircraft at Eglin Air Force Base, Florida, and was successful enough to warrant a combat evaluation. The Porter, designated AU-23A, was fitted with a side-firing 20mm M197 electric cannon, four wing pylons and a center fuselage station for external ordnance. The 20mm cannon was essentially a three-barrel version of the M61 Vulcan 6-barrel 20mm cannon. The aircraft could carry a variety of ordnance including forward-firing gun pods,  bombs, napalm units, cluster bomb units, flares, rockets, smoke grenades and leaflet dispensers.

Operational history

The combat evaluation, PAVE COIN, was done in June and July 1971. The AU-23A was tested for eight possible missions: armed escort of helicopters, close air support, hamlet defense, STOL airlift and resupply, armed reconnaissance, border surveillance, forward air control, and counter infiltration. USAF crews flew 73 missions (94 sorties) and RVNAF crews flew 68 missions (85 sorties). Several types of weapons were test dropped/fired including 2.75-inch (70 mm) rockets (explosive and smoke), CBU-14 cluster bombs, MK 6 Mod 3 flares, and MK 81, -82, and -106 practice bombs. More than 8,000 rounds of 20mm ammunition were fired, both high explosive incendiary and target practice tracer types. Several problems were discovered during the PAVE COIN program, the most serious was the extreme vulnerability of the aircraft to all but the lightest antiaircraft fire (below 12.7mm). Despite the problems, the USAF continued with the development program and ordered 15 AU-23As for further testing.

The 4400th Special Operations Squadron (Provisional) was created to complete the operational test and evaluation of the Credible Chase aircraft. The first AU-23A (72-1306) was delivered to the 4400th SOS on Jan. 2, 1972, followed by two more aircraft (72-1304 & 72-1305) at the end of the month. Testing continued until February 4, when the three aircraft were grounded because of cracks in the rudder assemblies. The first three aircraft were returned to Fairchild for repair and delivery of new aircraft resumed in late April 1972. On May 10, 1972, an AU-23A (S/N 72-1309) crashed after an in-flight engine failure. The pilot was not hurt, but all AU-23As were grounded until May 22, during the accident investigation. The last AU-23A was delivered on June 7 and testing was completed on June 28.

The 4400th recommended the aircraft not be used in combat without a major upgrade program. Specific problems identified included a slow combat speed, a low working altitude, no capability for "zoom" escapes after delivering ordnance and a complete lack of armor protection for the crew and vital aircraft systems. On June 30, 1972, the 4400th SOS ferried the AU-23As to Davis-Monthan Air Force Base, Arizona, for storage.

All AU-23A were supplied to Thailand under the Military Assistance Program for use in border surveillance and counter-infiltration roles.

Royal Thai Air Force 531 Sqn AU-23A JTh2-20/19 coded 42079 (former FY 74-2079) crash-landed in Khlong Hoi Khong district around noon on 5 March 2019.

Operators

Royal Thai Air Force : 34 AU-23A: 13 delivered in 1972, one in 1977 and 20 others in 1976.

United States Air Force : 15 AU-23A, 4400th Special Operations Squadron (Provisional) - former operator.

Specifications

See also

Notes

References
Larry Davis and Don Greer, Gunships, A Pictorial History of Spooky – Specials series (6032), Carrollton, TX: Squadron/Signal Publications, 1982.

External links

 Fairchild AU-23A – National Museum of the USAF
 Photos
 Video

1950s Swiss civil utility aircraft
PC-06
Single-engined tractor aircraft
Single-engined turboprop aircraft
Aircraft first flown in 1971